Critical Care is a 1997 American comedy film directed by Sidney Lumet. The film is a satire about American medicine. The screenplay by Steven Schwartz is based on the novel of the same name by Richard Dooling and stars James Spader, Kyra Sedgwick, Anne Bancroft, Helen Mirren, Jeffrey Wright, and Albert Brooks. Rick Baker provided special makeup effects. The film is about a doctor who finds himself involved in a fight with two half sisters over the care of their ailing father.

Cast
James Spader ... Dr. Werner Ernst 
Kyra Sedgwick ... Felicia Potter
Helen Mirren ... Stella
Anne Bancroft ... Nun
Albert Brooks ... Dr. Butz
Jeffrey Wright ... Bed Two 
Margo Martindale ... Constance "Connie" Potter 
Wallace Shawn ... Furnaceman 
Philip Bosco ... Dr. Hofstader 
Colm Feore ... Wilson
Edward Herrmann ...  Robert Payne
James Lally ...  Poindexter
Harvey Atkin ...  Judge Fatale
Al Waxman ...  Lawyer Sheldon Hatchett
Hamish McEwan ...  Dr. Hansen
Jackie Richardson ...  Mrs. Steckler
Barbara Eve Harris ...  Nurse Lucille
Conrad Coates ...  Dr. Miller
Bruno Dressler ...  Mr. Potter
Caroline Nielsen ...  Nurse Luscious

Reception
Writer Steven Schwartz was nominated for an Independent Spirit Award for best screenplay.

References

External links 

1997 films
Medical-themed films
Films directed by Sidney Lumet
1997 comedy films
American satirical films
Artisan Entertainment films
Village Roadshow Pictures films
Australian satirical films
1990s English-language films
1990s American films